Beramana North Grama Niladhari Division is a Grama Niladhari Division of the Kothmale Divisional Secretariat of Nuwara Eliya District of Central Province, Sri Lanka. It has Grama Niladhari Division Code 467D.

Rawanagoda are located within, nearby or associated with Beramana North.

Beramana North is a surrounded by the Wijayabahu Kanda, Beramana, Weerapura and Kolapathana Grama Niladhari Divisions.

Demographics

Ethnicity 
The Beramana North Grama Niladhari Division has a Sinhalese majority (99.8%). In comparison, the Kothmale Divisional Secretariat (which contains the Beramana North Grama Niladhari Division) has a Sinhalese majority (52.6%) and a significant Indian Tamil population (36.4%)

Religion 
The Beramana North Grama Niladhari Division has a Buddhist majority (99.8%). In comparison, the Kothmale Divisional Secretariat (which contains the Beramana North Grama Niladhari Division) has a Buddhist majority (52.3%) and a significant Hindu population (36.5%)

References 

Grama Niladhari Divisions of Kothmale Divisional Secretariat